Barun Chanda is an Indian Bengali advertising professional, actor and author based in the city of Kolkata. He is mostly remembered for his role in Satyajit Ray's Seemabaddha.

Biography 
Chanda was born in Dhaka in present day Bangladesh, but came to Kolkata at an early age to pursue higher education. Chanda acted in the 1971 Bengali movie Seemabaddha, directed by Satyajit Ray. After that he did not appear in any films for over twenty years. In 1992 he again acted in director Rituparno Ghosh's debut film Hirer Angti. Next he acted in Kalo Cheetah (2004). Since then he has acted in several movies like Tolly Lights, Antaheen, and Laptop. He recently played the role of the landlord father of Sonakshi Sinha in the Hindi film Lootera.

In 2014, he did commercials for CESC Limited with some social messages.

In 2019, Barun Chanda starred in an independent psychological thriller, Rakkhosh, which has been touted as India's first POV film to be shot on cinema camera. Chanda plays Dr. Idris Shah, a psychiatrist, in the film. The film made the official selection at Pune International Film Festival (PIFF), the Rajasthan International Film Festival (RIFF) and the Orange City International Film Festival (OCIFF) in 2019.

Filmography
 Seemabaddha (1971)
 Hirer Angti (1992)
 Lal Darja (1997)
 Kalo Chita (2004)
 Anuranan (2006)
 Cholo Let's Go (2008)
 Tolly Lights (2008)
 Antaheen (2009)
 Flop-E (2011)
 System (2011)
 Laptop (2011)
 Elar Char Adhyay (2012)
 Hemlock Society (2012)
 Sector V (2012)
 Aborto (2013)
Lootera (2013)
Mishawr Rawhoshyo (2013)
Swabhoomi (2013)
Chotushkone (2014)
Roy (2015)
Bela Seshe (2015)
Chorabali (2016)
Kuheli (2016)
Mentor (2016)
Sohra Bridge (2016)
Ebong Kiriti (2017)
Rina Brown (2017)
Ek Je Chhilo Raja (2018)
Rupkothar Kahini (2018)
Bhobishyoter Bhoot (2019)
Dil Bechara (2020)
Bob Biswas (2021)
Habu Chandra Raja Gobu Chandra Montri (2021) 
Shyam Singha Roy (2021)
Danny Detective INC (2021)
Karnasubarner Guptodhon (2022)Commando (2022)  Khela Jokhon (2022)One Way (2022)Mrs Chatterjee Vs Norway (2023)

 Books 
 Robibar Coke Murder in the Monastery Kidnap''

References

External links 
 

Living people
Male actors in Bengali cinema
20th-century Indian male actors
21st-century Indian male actors
Year of birth missing (living people)